Dear Mr. President may refer to:
 Dear Mr. President (album), 1942 Almanac Singers album
 "Dear Mr. President" (Fredwreck song), 2004 Fredwreck single
 "Dear Mr. President" (Pink song), 2006 Pink single
 "Dear Mr. President", 4 Non Blondes single from the 1992 album Bigger, Better, Faster, More!